The 1977 British Formula Three season was the 27th season of the British Formula Three season. Derek Daly took the B.A.R.C. BP Super Visco British Formula 3 Championship, while Stephen South took the B.R.D.C. Vandervell British Formula 3 Championship.

The success of the European Championship, now in its third season, stole some of the limelight from the British championships in 1977 and the continuing divide between the BP-sponsored BARC title and the Vandervell-sponsored BRDC title cannot have helped.

South started the season in dominant form in the March 763-Toyota he had raced in the previous year and led both championships into July. After wrecking the 763 in an accident with Len Cooke he moved over to a March 773-Toyota and the BP series turned into a three-way fight with Daly and Cooke. Daly led into the final round and clinched the title by winning after his rivals dropped out. South's consolation was the Vandervell title. Both drivers moved into F2 for 1978 but only Daly was able to secure a proper budget.

B.A.R.C. BP Super Visco British F3 Championship
Champion:  Derek Daly

Joint Runner Up:  Stephen South and  Eje Elgh

Results

Table

B.R.D.C. Vandervell British F3 Championship
Champion:  Stephen South

Runner Up:  Brett Riley

Results

Table

Non-Championship Races

Results

References

British Formula Three Championship seasons
Formula Three